Saurogobio dumerili is a species of cyprinid fish endemic to China.

Named in honor of Auguste Duméril (1812–1870), herpetologist and ichthyologist, Muséum national d’Histoire naturelle (Paris), who invited Bleeker to examine Chinese cyprinids in the museum’s collection.

References

Saurogobio
Taxa named by Pieter Bleeker
Fish described in 1871